Playthroughs is a studio album by American electronic musician Keith Fullerton Whitman, released on Kranky in 2002. It was recorded in analogue manner by using electric guitar and processing its sounds.

Pitchfork gave the album an extraordinarily high note of 9.7/10. They placed it at number 36 on its list of the "Top 50 Albums of 2002" and at number 85 on its list of "The Top 100 Albums of 2000-04". Pitchfork also named "Playthroughs" 23rd best ambient album of all time in 2016.

Track listing

References

External links
 
Album stream at Bandcamp

2002 albums
Keith Fullerton Whitman albums
Kranky albums